Missouri Route 138 is a short highway (about one mile) in southern Buchanan County, Missouri, United States. Its eastern terminus is at Route 45/Route 273 north of Iatan. Its western terminus is in Lewis and Clark State Park. There are no towns on the highway.

Route description
Route 138 begins on the south shore of Lewis and Clark Lake in the community of Lewis and Clark Village within Lewis and Clark State Park, where the road continues east as Lake Shore Drive. From the beginning point, the route heads southwest on two-lane undivided Lake Shore Drive, passing fields and woods in the state park. The road turns to the east and becomes Lakecrest Boulevard, intersecting Lake Shore Drive again. Route 138 comes to its eastern terminus at an intersection with Route 45/Route 273.

Major intersections

References

138
Transportation in Buchanan County, Missouri